Universal Interactive (formerly Universal Interactive Studios) was an American video game publisher. The company was established on January 4, 1994, and led by Skip Paul and Robert Biniaz of MCA. It was best known for producing the Crash Bandicoot and Spyro platform game franchises.

In 2000, the merger of Vivendi and Universal Studios consolidated the division into Vivendi's Havas Interactive, which was renamed Vivendi Universal Games the next year. Universal Interactive continued as a label until 2004, when Vivendi began divesting ownership of Universal Studios, retaining the newly renamed Vivendi Games.

History

Predecessors (1982–1993) 
MCA, Universal's parent company from 1962 to 1990, initially licensed video games directly as merchandise. In 1982, Atari licensed and released E.T. the Extra-Terrestrial, a tie-in game cited as one of the biggest commercial failures in video game history. The licensing deal united director Steven Spielberg and MCA president Sidney Sheinberg with Atari general counsel Charles "Skip" Paul, who joined MCA after 1984. In 1985, MCA purchased LJN, a toy manufacturer which began publishing video games in 1987.

In 1990, MCA was sold to Matsushita Electric (now Panasonic), and LJN was sold to Acclaim Entertainment. Within the next two years, Matsushita partnered with The 3DO Company, pledging Panasonic as a manufacturer for the 3DO Interactive Multiplayer, and MCA as an entertainment software partner.

Universal Interactive Studios (1994–1999) 
The company was founded on January 4, 1994, in tandem with the 1994 Winter Consumer Electronics Show. Leading key personnel for the foundation were Skip Paul and Robert Biniaz. On February 10, MCA acquired a minority stake in Interplay Productions, which would publish Disruptor outside of North America, and later enter into a distribution deal with successor Vivendi Universal Games.

The company's first titles in mid-1994 were Jurassic Park Interactive, developed by Studio 3DO and initially announced in 1993; and Way of the Warrior, developed by Naughty Dog.

Universal contracted with Naughty Dog and Insomniac Games to develop games utilizing the facilities at Universal City, under vice president Mark Cerny. They respectively released Crash Bandicoot in 1996 and Spyro the Dragon in 1998, under publishing arrangements with Sony Computer Entertainment.

Starting in 1995, with the purchase of MCA by Canadian beverage company Seagram, Universal Studios was reorganized. By 1998, the Interactive Studios division was brought under the Universal Studios New Media Group, led by Paul Rioux. That year, Cerny resigned to launch Cerny Games, which continued to consult directly with Insomniac and Naughty Dog.

An in-house development unit, Universal Studios Digital Arts, was created to develop Xena: Warrior Princess.

By the end of 1999, UIS transitioned solely from the PlayStation to include PC and Dreamcast development as well, as well as planned support for next-generation systems.

In July 2000, UIS announced one of their first PlayStation 2 projects, a tie-in to the then-upcoming The Mummy Returns, which would release near the time of the movie.

Partnership with Konami 
On December 17, 1999, Universal Interactive Studios and Konami announced a global strategic alliance. The deal would allow Konami to distribute and market titles from UIS that were based on existing Universal Studios properties, with franchises part of the deal including The Mummy, Universal Studios Monsters, Dr. Seuss' How the Grinch Stole Christmas and Woody Woodpecker.

In January 2000, UIS and Konami officially announced that the first title under their new partnership would be the Dreamcast title Nightmare Creatures 2.

The deal expanded further on April 27, allowing Konami to publish and market more titles.

The four PlayStation titles released as part of this partnership were announced at E3 2000 by Konami: Woody Woodpecker Racing, The Grinch, The Mummy and Monster Force.

In September, the deal was expanded further to include three brand new next-gen titles: The Thing, a sequel to the 1982 movie of the same name for the Xbox, as well as separate titles for the Game Boy Color and Game Boy Advance, a tie-in game to the then-upcoming Jurassic Park 3, and an upcoming Crash Bandicoot title.

Vivendi merger (2000–2006) 
In July 2000, Seagram merged Universal Studios with Vivendi. After the merger closed, UIS was transitioned to Vivendi's Havas Interactive division and was eventually downgraded to a publishing label of the now-named Vivendi Universal Interactive Publishing. Titles that would be published under the name were primarily a mix of Spyro and Crash Bandicoot sequels and licensed titles based on other Universal IPs.

2001 
At UIS' first E3 under their new owners in 2001, the company signed an exclusive worldwide partnership with Microsoft to publish titles based on Bruce Lee exclusively for the Xbox, with the first being Bruce Lee: Quest of the Dragon. No release window was announced for the title. Other announced titles at the event included the first Spyro title for a non-PlayStation system: Spyro: Season of Ice for the Game Boy Advance. Previously announced titles The Mummy Returns and Crash Bandicoot: The Wrath of Cortex were also showcased.

On August 13, UIS announced the first Crash Bandicoot title for a non-PlayStation system: Crash Bandicoot XS for the Game Boy Advance (later renamed to Crash Bandicoot: The Huge Adventure for North America), and would be released for an Early-2002 release window.

Near the end of the year, Universal Interactive Studios' name was shortened to simply Universal Interactive.

2002 
On January 17, the company announced to publish two titles based on The Scorpion King: Rise of the Akkadian for the Nintendo GameCube and Sword of Osiris for the Game Boy Advance. On January 31, an Xbox version of Crash Bandicoot: The Wrath of Cortex was announced by the company for a Q1 2002 release window.

During Vivendi Universal Games' first Game Faire on February 19, 2002, Universal Interactive showcased twelve titles: which featured previously announced titles Bruce Lee: Quest of the Dragon (which was announced to be released within the third quarter of 2002), The Scorpion King: Sword of Osiris, The Thing, and both The Scorpion King titles (with a PS2 version announced) and newly announced titles such as Jurassic Park: Project Genesis for a Q4 2002 window on the PlayStation 2, Xbox and PC, Spyro: Season of Flame for Game Boy Advance for Q3 2002, and Spyro: Enter the Dragonfly for the PlayStation 2 for a Q4 2002 release, and Monster Force for Game Boy Advance for Q3 2002. The already-announced Lord of the Rings titles for the Xbox and Game Boy Advance were also transferred over from VU's Sierra Entertainment subsidiary to Universal.

Before E3 2002 on May 7, Universal Interactive announced a GameCube port of Crash Bandicoot: The Wrath of Cortex for a Q3 2002 release.

On June 11, Universal Interactive announced plans to publish titles based on The Hulk, with one for consoles and PCs, and another for the Game Boy Advance. On July 9, the company's GameCube portfolio expanded with the announcements of a GCN port of Spyro: Enter the Dragonfly, and the acquisition of 4x4 Evo 2 within an unknown time frame. In August 2002, Vivendi Universal Games announced that The Thing and The Lord of the Rings: The Fellowship of the Ring were transferred over from Universal Interactive to the newly formed Black Label Games label, which would be aimed for more mature titles.

Near the summer, another Game Boy Advance Crash Bandicoot title was announced: Crash Bandicoot 2: N-Tranced.

2003 
On January 28, a Bruce Lee title for the Game Boy Advance titled Bruce Lee: Return of the Legend was announced.

On April 24, Universal Interactive's parent company announced their plans for E3 2003, and announced several new titles to be released under the Universal Interactive label: Spyro: Attack of the Rhynocs for the Game Boy Advance, Battlestar Galactica for the PlayStation 2 and Xbox, Crash Nitro Kart for consoles and Game Boy Advance, and The Fast and the Furious for the PlayStation 2 and Xbox.

2004–2006 
In 2004, Universal Interactive was consolidated under its parent company Vivendi Universal Games, and the label was discontinued. It remained as a copyright holder for existing properties, but all titles were published under either Vivendi Universal Games or Sierra.

Vivendi Universal then announced that on March 3, 2006, as a result of divesting Universal Studios to General Electric, it and several of its divisions, including Vivendi Universal Games, would cease using the "Universal" name and would simply become Vivendi, with Vivendi Universal Games becoming Vivendi Games.

Games

References

External links 
 

1993 establishments in California
2000 disestablishments in California
Companies based in Los Angeles County, California
Defunct companies based in Greater Los Angeles
Defunct video game companies of the United States
Entertainment companies based in California
Former Vivendi subsidiaries
Video game companies disestablished in 2000
Video game companies established in 1993
Video game development companies
Video game publishers
Universal Pictures